Tiffany Fallon (born May 1, 1974 in Fort Lauderdale, Florida) is an American model. In 2004, she was photographed by Stephen Wayda for Playboy and was named Playmate of the Month for December. She was also named Playmate of the Year for 2005.

Career 
In addition to her work with Playboy, Fallon was a cheerleader for the Atlanta Falcons. Prior to that, she worked as a flight attendant.

Personal life 
Fallon is of Irish-American descent. She was Homecoming Queen and senior Class President at her high school where she played volleyball, soccer and ran track. She was Miss Georgia in 2001 and also 2nd-runner up for Miss USA in 2001. She has a degree in sports management from Florida State University.

Fallon married Joe Don Rooney of the country singing group Rascal Flatts on April 23, 2006, and she lives in Brentwood, Tennessee. On May 31, 2008, Fallon gave birth to their first child, son Jagger Donovan Rooney. On September 7, 2010, their daughter, Raquel Blue, was born. On September 29, 2014, their third child, daughter Devon Olivia, was born. She and Joe Don separated in 2022.

Television appearances 
 Fallon first appeared in Toby Keith's country music video "Who's Your Daddy?".
 She had made several comedic guest star appearances on Spike TV's The Lance Krall Show.
 Fallon was on an episode of The Simple Life: Interns as a judge for a beauty pageant which Paris Hilton participated in.
 Co-host of the International Fight League's weekly program IFL Battleground with MMA legend, Bas Rutten.
 Fallon competed on The Celebrity Apprentice, playing for charity. She was the first contestant to be fired by Donald Trump.
 Appears in Cletus T Judd's country music video for "I Love Nascar."

References

External links 
 
 
 

1974 births
Living people
Florida State University alumni
Miss USA 2001 delegates
National Football League cheerleaders
People from Fort Lauderdale, Florida
2000s Playboy Playmates
Playboy Playmates of the Year
Participants in American reality television series
American cheerleaders
The Apprentice (franchise) contestants